Emil Druc (born 17 May 1956) is a Moldovan diplomat. He is the Moldovan Ambassador to Sweden.

References

External links 
 NATO Information Point in Balti, Moldova – another step towards greater confidence

Living people
1956 births
Ambassadors of Moldova to Sweden
Ambassadors of Moldova to Finland